The National Dream is a 1970 Canadian non-fiction book by Pierre Berton describing the planning and commencement of the Canadian Pacific Railway between 1871 and 1881.

Following the book's success, a 1971 sequel (The Last Spike) described the construction phase between 1881 and 1885. Both books formed the basis for the TV miniseries The National Dream.

Editions
 1970 (McClelland and Stewart): 
 1974, combined with The Last Spike (McClelland and Stewart): 
 2001 (Anchor Canada): 

1970 non-fiction books
20th-century history books
History books about Canada
Books by Pierre Berton
Works about rail transport
McClelland & Stewart books